Beit Awwa is a Palestinian town in the southern West Bank, in the Hebron Governorate of the State of Palestine, located 22 kilometers west of Hebron and 4 kilometers west of Dura. According to the Palestinian Central Bureau of Statistics, Beit Awwa had a population of 8,064 inhabitants in 2007.

History
In 1838,  during the  Ottoman era, Edward Robinson noted Beit 'Auwa   as a place "in ruins or deserted," part of the area between the mountains and  Gaza, but subject to the government of el-Khulil. He further remarked that the ruins "covering low hills on both sides of the path, exhibiting foundations of hewn stones, from which all that can be inferred is, that here was once an extensive town."

In 1863, Victor Guérin visited Beit Awwa, which he called Khirbet Beit el-Haoua. He described finding many artificial caves, some of which were large and had shaped domes, other smaller with square ceilings. Most entries were surrounded by piles of stones from old demolished buildings.

In 1875,  the PEF's Survey of Palestine  visited Beit Awwa. They described several ruins, each with a different name;  "Khurbet es Sueity, Khurbet el Mehami, Khurbet el Kusah are all sites with foundations and caves. El Kusr is an ancient watch-tower, with drystone walls in ruins; el Keniseh seems to be a ruined church; foundations, capitals, shafts, and lintels with the Maltese cross on them, remain showing a Byzantine building. There is also a fine font  fitted for immersion. In the centre a square basin, 2 feet 3 inches side, 7 inches deep ; four steps lead down, 5 inches high, 9 inches broad ; the whole surrounded by four segmental recesses, the external form of the font being that of a rounded cross, the longest measurement either way being 5 feet, and the total height outside 2 feet 4 inches."

British Mandate era
At the time of the 1931 census of Palestine the population of Beit Awwa was counted under Dura.

Jordanian era
In November 1948, during the 1948 Arab-Israeli War soldiers from the Israeli 5th Brigade attacked   Beit Awwa,  Idhna and Kh. Sikka. At  Beit Awwa, the attackers were driven off.
In March 1949, the 4th Brigade attacked  Beit Awwa and surrounding villages.  Their attack orders were to "hit every  [adult male] Arab" they encountered. All in all, they drove out 7,000 people eastward. With UN the villagers were eventually allowed back.

In the wake of the 1948 Arab–Israeli War, and after the 1949 Armistice Agreements, Beit Awwa came under Jordanian rule.

In 1961, the population of Beit Awwa was  1,368.

1967, aftermath
After the Six-Day War in 1967,  Beit Awwa has been under Israeli occupation.

The population in the 1967 census conducted by the Israeli authorities was 1,468. After the 1967 six day war Beit Awwa was completely destroyed. Moshe Dayan claimed the destruction was carried out under the orders of an officer who wished to expel the residents, Brigadier General Uzi Narkiss claimed the credit for the action.

The two prominent clans of Beit Awwa are Masalmea and Sewiti. The latter migrated to the area from ar-Ramtha, Jordan.

Its total land area is 470 dunams, 30% of it lands before 1948; due to the town's proximity Green Line hundreds of dunams are a part of modern-day Israel.

References

Bibliography

External links
Welcome To Bayt 'Awwa
Beit Awa, Welcome to Palestine
Survey of Western Palestine, Map 21:    IAA, Wikimedia commons
Beit 'Awwa Village (Fact Sheet),   Applied Research Institute–Jerusalem, (ARIJ)
Beit ‘Awwa Village Profile, ARIJ
Beit 'Awwa aerial photo, ARIJ

Hebron Governorate
Towns in the West Bank
Municipalities of the State of Palestine